Anthony Sammy is a Trinidadian businessman and politician.

Career
Sammy was vice-chairman of the National Alliance for Reconstruction (NAR)’s Port-of-Spain South constituency in the 1980s with then MP Theodore Guerra. In 1987 he was elected to the Port-of-Spain City Corporation as an NAR councillor. He joined the Parliament of Trinidad and Tobago as a temporary Opposition Senator, affiliated to the United National Congress, making his maiden contribution in November 2006. He served in this role until 28 September 2007.

In the 2007 general election, Sammy contested the Port of Spain South constituency for the United National Congress.

In 2010, Sammy was appointed as chairman of the Diego Martin Regional Corporation. He heads Cirkel Trinidad, an import/export firm.

References

Members of the Senate (Trinidad and Tobago)
People from Port of Spain
Living people
National Alliance for Reconstruction politicians
United National Congress politicians
21st-century Trinidad and Tobago politicians
Year of birth missing (living people)